Lasiodora difficilis, common name Brazilian red birdeater, is a species of tarantulas belonging to the family Theraphosidae.

Distribution
This species is native to Brazil.

Habitat
These tarantulas live in rainforests characterized by a wet tropical climate with little or no dry season and abundant rainfall.

Behavior
These spiders take refuge in a long hole or under roots or stones. They feed on insects, worms, grasshoppers and crickets. The egg sac may contain  500-1000 spiderlings.

Description
Males are smaller than female. The basic color of these heavy-bodied spiders varies between black and black-gray, with urticating red hairs on the abdomen.

References

Theraphosidae
Spiders of Brazil
Spiders described in 1921